Black List is an EP by the American pop rock musician Alex Chilton, released in 1990.

The E.P. includes three Chilton originals and three cover versions. These are a cover of Ronny & the Daytonas' "Little G.T.O." on which Chilton played all the instruments; a version of Frank Sinatra's "Nice 'n' Easy", and a song penned by country blues musician Furry Lewis.

Black List was re-released in 1994 on a compilation CD together with Chilton's High Priest album, on Razor & Tie Records.

Track listing
"Little G.T.O." (John Wilkin) – 2:52
"Guantanamerika" (Alex Chilton) – 3:11
"Jailbait" (Chilton) – 3:31
"Baby Baby Baby" (Chilton) – 4:22
"Nice and Easy Does It" (Alan Bergman, Marilyn Keith, Lew Spence) – 4:36
"I Will Turn Your Money Green" (Furry Lewis, Traditional) – 2:53

Personnel
Alex Chilton – guitar, vocals; bass guitar, drums on track 1
Tommy McClure – bass guitar
Doug Garrison – drums
Jim Spake – saxophone
George Reineke – backing vocals on track 1
Recorded at Ardent Studios, Memphis, Tennessee
Engineered by Tom Laune
Sleeve design by Huart/Cholley
Photography by Alain Duplantier

References

Alex Chilton albums
1989 EPs